The SBP-04 and SBP-07 are two circular Italian minimum metal anti-tank blast mines. The mines are very similar, differing only in the size of the main charge. The mines have a central raised pressure plate a fuze assembly, similar to the SH-55. They are waterproof and are non-buoyant, and have a shelf life of ten years.

The mines can be fitted with SAT programmable fuzes, which have self-neutralization and anti-handling features.

Specifications

References
 Jane's Mines and Mine Clearance 2005-2006
 

Anti-tank mines of Italy